Arden railway station (previously Store-Arden railway station) is a railway station serving the railway town of Arden in Himmerland, Denmark.

The station is located on the Randers-Aalborg Line from Randers to Aalborg. It opened in 1869. The train services are currently operated by the railway company DSB.

History 
The station opened in 1869 with the opening of the Randers-Aalborg railway line from Randers to Aalborg. It survived a series of station closures in the 1970s.

Operations 
The train services are operated by the railway company DSB. The station offers direct InterCity services to Copenhagen and Aalborg.

See also 
List of railway stations in Denmark

References

Bibliography

External links
 Banedanmark – government agency responsible for maintenance and traffic control of most of the Danish railway network
 DSB – largest Danish train operating company
 Danske Jernbaner – website with information on railway history in Denmark
 Nordjyllands Jernbaner – website with information on railway history in North Jutland

Railway stations in the North Jutland Region
Railway stations opened in 1869
1869 establishments in Denmark
Railway stations in Denmark opened in the 19th century